"Naked and Sacred" is a song by American singer and actress Chynna Phillips from her first solo album, Naked and Sacred (1995). Written by Phillips, Billy Steinberg and Rick Nowels, the song was released as Phillips' debut solo single on October 10, 1995, and charted at number 15 in Australia and number 62 in the United Kingdom. It was also a modest adult contemporary hit in Canada, peaking at number 19 on the RPM Adult Contemporary chart.

In 1998, British singer Maria Nayler covered the song. It reached number 32 on the UK Singles Chart.

Track listings

US and UK cassette single
 "Naked and Sacred" (album version) – 4:10
 "Follow Love Down" – 3:42

US and UK 12-inch single
A1. "Naked and Sacred" (classic club mix) – 7:56
A2. "Naked and Sacred" (dub mix) – 7:01
B1. "Naked and Sacred" (radio mix) – 4:04
B2. "Naked and Sacred" (naked dub) – 6:53
B3. "Naked and Sacred" (reprise) – 3:30

UK CD single
 "Naked and Sacred" (album version) – 4:10
 "Naked and Sacred" (radio mix) – 4:04
 "Naked and Sacred" (classic club mix) – 7:56
 "Follow Love Down" – 3:42

European and Australian CD single
 "Naked and Sacred" – 4:06
 "Follow Love Down" – 3:41
 "Life Ain't No Dress Rehearsal" – 3:55

Charts

Weekly charts

Year-end charts

Release history

References

1995 debut singles
1995 songs
1998 singles
EMI Records singles
Song recordings produced by Billy Steinberg
Song recordings produced by Rick Nowels
Songs written by Billy Steinberg
Songs written by Rick Nowels